The Arlington Plantation is a historic plantation located near Lake Providence, Louisiana. It was listed on the National Register of Historic Places on October 3, 1980.

The plantation house has a six-bay two-story Doric gallery, and it overlooks a broad sloping lawn towards Lake Providence.  The property includes the house, a twentieth century frame cottage, a gazebo over a cistern, a garage, and a buggy shed. It is significant as one of only about four two-story galleried Greek Revival mansions in northeastern Louisiana, and for its association with Edward Sparrow, "an immensely wealthy cotton planter and Confederate politician".

The mansion was listed on the National Register of Historic Places along with several other Lake Providence properties and districts that were studied together in the Lake Providence MRA on October 3, 1980.

See also
National Register of Historic Places listings in East Carroll Parish, Louisiana
Lake Providence Commercial Historic District
Lake Providence Residential Historic District

Fischer House
Nelson House
Old Courthouse Square

References

Farms on the National Register of Historic Places in Louisiana
National Register of Historic Places in East Carroll Parish, Louisiana
Greek Revival architecture in Louisiana
Buildings and structures completed in 1830
Buildings and structures in East Carroll Parish, Louisiana
Plantations in Louisiana